Taufik Hidayat (born 10 August 1981) is an Indonesian retired badminton player. He is a former World, Olympic, two time Asian Games, and three time Asian champion, and the youngest world number one in the men's singles. Hidayat has won the Indonesia Open six times (1999, 2000, 2002, 2003, 2004 and 2006). He is considered to be one of the greatest men's single players in badminton history and has the nickname "Mr.Backhand".

Career summary 
When he was young, he joined the SGS club, a badminton club in Bandung, where he trained under Iie Sumirat.

At age 17 he won the Brunei Open and reached the semifinals of the 1998 Asian Championships and the Indonesia Open. In 1999, Hidayat won his first Indonesian Open title. In the same year he also reached the final of the All England and the Singapore Open but lost the finals to his great rival Peter Gade and his senior in the national team Heryanto Arbi respectively. Hidayat achieved the world number one ranking when he was still 19 years old in 2000 after winning the Malaysia Open, Asian Championships, Indonesia Open and was once again runner-up at the All England Open where he was defeated by Chinese player Xia Xuanze.

2000 Sydney Olympics 
Hidayat participated in the men's singles competition at the 2000 Summer Olympics in Sydney. In his first Olympics, he was eliminated in the quarter-finals by Ji Xinpeng of China.

2004 Athens Olympics 
Hidayat won the men's singles gold medal at the 2004 Summer Olympics defeating Hidetaka Yamada of Japan and Wong Choong Hann of Malaysia in the first two rounds. Hidayat defeated Peter Gade of Denmark 15–12, 15–12 in the quarter final and Boonsak Ponsana of Thailand 15–9, 15–2 in the semifinal. Playing in the gold medal match, He defeated Korean Shon Seung-mo 15–8, 15–7 in the final to win the gold medal.

In the same year, Hidayat successfully retained his Indonesia Open title by defeating Chen Hong 15–9, 15–3 in the final and won his second Asian Championships title.

2005: World Championships 
In August 2005, he won the men's singles title at the World Championships defeating world number one Lin Dan of China 15–3, 15–7 in the final. With this title, he became the first men's singles player to hold the Olympic and World Championships title in consecutive years.

2006–2007: Second Asian and Southeast Asian Games gold 
Hidayat won the men's singles gold medal at the Asian Games in 2002 Busan and 2006 Doha. He also won the 2007 Asian Championship, and two men's singles gold medals at the Southeast Asian Games in 1999 Bandar Seri Begawan and 2007 Nakhon Ratchasima.

2008 Beijing Olympics 
Hidayat competed in the 2008 Summer Olympics but he was eliminated in the second round by Wong Choong Hann of Malaysia.

2012 London Olympics 
For the fourth time, Hidayat participated in the Summer Olympics. Hidayat competed at the 2012 Summer Olympics but he was eliminated in the round of 16 by Lin Dan of China.

Popular media has at times focused on the perceived rivalry between Hidayat and Chinese player Lin Dan, referring to the two as "arch rivals". This was the last time that Hidayat participated in the Summer Olympics.

Personal life 
He married the daughter of Agum Gumelar, Ami Gumelar, on 4 February 2006. They had a daughter in early August 2008, named Natarina Alika Hidayat. She was born shortly before he had to leave for the World Championships.

In December 2012, Hidayat officially open a badminton training center named Taufik Hidayat Arena (THA), located at Ciracas, East Jakarta. This "house of badminton" is both named and owned by Taufik.

Player attributes 
Hidayat's shot-making strengths were his backhand (as he is perhaps most famous for his backhand smash, revered for its unusually high generation of power), forehand jump smash, drop shot (reverse slice in particular), smooth footwork and deceiving net play. Hidayat's forehand jump smash in the 2006 World Championships was once the fastest smash recorded in singles competition; he recorded  in a match against Ng Wei. This power on both his forehand and backhand, combined with his tenacity at the net and scope for deceptive shots, provided him with an extremely diverse weaponry on court, making him one of the most difficult players to face on the open circuit. Criticisms were aimed at his occasional lack of fitness, impatience with loud crowds, and his propensity to return a net shot with another net shot even when his opponent was dangerously close to the net.

Participation in the Indonesian team 
 6 times at Sudirman Cup (1999, 2001, 2003, 2005, 2007, 2011)
 7 times at Thomas Cup (2000, 2002, 2004, 2006, 2008, 2010, 2012)
 4 times at Summer Olympics at individual event (2000, 2004, 2008, 2012)

Awards and nominations

Achievements

Olympic Games 
Men's singles

World Championships 
Men's singles

World Cup 
Men's singles

Asian Games 
Men's singles

Asian Championships 
Men's singles

Southeast Asian Games 
Men's singles

BWF Superseries (1 title, 9 runners-up) 
The BWF Superseries, launched on 14 December 2006 and implemented in 2007, is a series of elite badminton tournaments, sanctioned by Badminton World Federation (BWF). BWF Superseries has two level such as Superseries and Superseries Premier. A season of Superseries features twelve tournaments around the world, which introduced since 2011, with successful players invited to the BWF Superseries Finals held at the year end.

Men's singles

  Superseries Finals tournament
  Superseries Premier tournament
  Superseries tournament

BWF Grand Prix (17 titles, 7 runners-up) 
The BWF Grand Prix has two levels, the BWF Grand Prix and Grand Prix Gold. It is a series of badminton tournaments sanctioned by the Badminton World Federation (BWF) since 2007. The World Badminton Grand Prix has been sanctioned by International Badminton Federation (IBF) since 1983.

Men's singles

  BWF Grand Prix Gold tournament
  BWF/IBF Grand Prix tournament

Performance timeline

National team 
 Junior level

 Senior level

Individual competitions 
 Junior level

 Senior level

Record against selected opponents 
Record against Superseries finalists, World Championships semifinalists and Olympic quarterfinalists.

  Bao Chunlai 5–9
  Chen Hong 9–2
  Chen Jin 2–4
  Chen Long 2–4
  Chen Yu 7–0
  Du Pengyu 5–1
  Ji Xinpeng 0-2
  Lin Dan 4–13
  Xia Xuanze 2–2
  Viktor Axelsen 0–1
  Peter Gade 10–8
  Poul-Erik Høyer Larsen 1–1
  Jan Ø. Jørgensen 2–2
  Kevin Cordón 1–0
  Hariyanto Arbi 0–1
  Hendrawan 2–1
  Sony Dwi Kuncoro 3–3
  Tommy Sugiarto 2–1
  Sho Sasaki 1–3
  Lee Hyun-il 2–4
  Park Sung-hwan 11–2
  Son Wan-ho 3–0
  Lee Chong Wei 8–15
  Liew Daren 2–1
  Wong Choong Hann 4–6
  Ronald Susilo 3–1
  Boonsak Ponsana 10–1

References

External links 
 
 
 
 
 

1981 births
Living people
Sportspeople from Bandung
Sundanese people
Indonesian male badminton players
Badminton players at the 2000 Summer Olympics
Badminton players at the 2004 Summer Olympics
Badminton players at the 2008 Summer Olympics
Badminton players at the 2012 Summer Olympics
Olympic badminton players of Indonesia
Olympic gold medalists for Indonesia
Olympic medalists in badminton
Medalists at the 2004 Summer Olympics
Badminton players at the 1998 Asian Games
Badminton players at the 2002 Asian Games
Badminton players at the 2006 Asian Games
Badminton players at the 2010 Asian Games
Asian Games gold medalists for Indonesia
Asian Games silver medalists for Indonesia
Asian Games bronze medalists for Indonesia
Asian Games medalists in badminton
Medalists at the 1998 Asian Games
Medalists at the 2002 Asian Games
Medalists at the 2006 Asian Games
Medalists at the 2010 Asian Games
Competitors at the 1999 Southeast Asian Games
Competitors at the 2005 Southeast Asian Games
Competitors at the 2007 Southeast Asian Games
Competitors at the 2011 Southeast Asian Games
Southeast Asian Games gold medalists for Indonesia
Southeast Asian Games bronze medalists for Indonesia
Southeast Asian Games medalists in badminton
World No. 1 badminton players
20th-century Indonesian people
21st-century Indonesian people